Cradle of Man is a modern play by Melanie Marnich. It has been performed in Chicago and Dallas and stars David Eigenberg, Jennie Moreau, Peggy Roeder, Sean Cooper and Julie Ganey. It is set in Africa and deals with themes of lust, jealousy and our relationship with these primitive impulses.

External links
Script of Cradle of Man
Review on www.theatermania.com
Profile of Melanie Marnich

2005 plays
American plays